Sarkaghat is a city and a tehsil, near Mandi city in Mandi district of the Indian state of Himachal Pradesh.

Sarkaghat is one of the 5 Local Urban Bodies in Mandi District. The town is located about 60 km away from the district headquarters at Mandi. It is a main business centre and is the fourth-largest town in the district.

The Sarkaghat Local Urban Body came into existence in 1981. The Nagar Panchayat of Sarkaghat has seven wards. The new ward of Dabrog was recently included in the Nagar Panchayat. The present population of this town is about 6000 and the floating population is about 1 Lakh per month.

The town has a Government Hospital. PPR Memorial Hospital is the only private hospital located in Sarkaghat. The bus station is under the control of Himachal Road Transport Corporation (HRTC).

Sarkaghat has one Govt. P.G. College, one Govt. Hospital, Senior Secondary School, Mini Secretariat in which the various Govt. Department Office of Sub-Division level function.

Sarkaghat also have CBSE affiliated schools, R K International School which is located near the Nabahi Devi Temple. and SPS International School situated in Tatahar.

Demographics
Sarkaghat is a Nagar Panchayat city in district of Mandi, Himachal Pradesh. The Sarkaghat city is divided into seven wards for which elections are held every five years. The Sarkaghat Nagar Panchayat has population of 4,715 of which 2,522 are males while 2,193 are females as per report released by Census India 2011.

Population of Children with age of 0-6 is 419 which is 8.89% of total population of Sarkaghat (NP). In Sarkaghat Nagar Panchayat, Female Sex Ratio is of 870 against state average of 972. Moreover, Child Sex Ratio in Sarkaghat is around 669 compared to Himachal Pradesh state average of 909. Literacy rate of Sarkaghat city is 89.29% higher than state average of 82.80%. In Sarkaghat, Male literacy is around 92.65% while female literacy rate is 85.53%.

Sarkaghat Nagar Panchayat has total administration over 1,184 houses to which it supplies basic amenities like water and sewerage. It is also authorized to build roads within Nagar Panchayat limits and impose taxes on properties coming under its jurisdiction.

References

Cities and towns in Mandi district
Tehsils of Himachal Pradesh